Mahmudabad (also Romanized as Maḩmūdābād) is a village in Jazmurian Rural District, Jazmurian District, Rudbar-e Jonubi County, Kerman Province, Iran. At the 2006 census, its population was 47, in 13 families.

References 

Populated places in Rudbar-e Jonubi County